A G-type main-sequence star (spectral type: G-V), also often, and imprecisely called a yellow dwarf, or G star, is a main-sequence star (luminosity class V) of spectral type G. Such a star has about 0.9 to 1.1 solar masses and an effective temperature between about 5,300 and 6,000 K. Like other main-sequence stars, a G-type main-sequence star converts the element hydrogen to helium in its core by means of nuclear fusion, but can also fuse helium when hydrogen runs out. The Sun, the star in the center of the Solar System to which the Earth is gravitationally bound, is an example of a G-type main-sequence star (G2V type). Each second, the Sun fuses approximately 600 million tons of hydrogen into helium in a process known as the proton–proton chain (4 hydrogens form 1 helium), converting about 4 million tons of matter to energy. Besides the Sun, other well-known examples of G-type main-sequence stars include Alpha Centauri, Tau Ceti, Capella and 51 Pegasi.

Description
The term yellow dwarf is a misnomer, because G-type stars actually range in color from white, for more luminous types like the Sun, to only very slightly yellowish for less massive and luminous G-type main-sequence stars. The Sun is in fact white, but it can often appear yellow, orange or red through Earth's atmosphere due to atmospheric Rayleigh scattering, especially at sunrise and sunset. In addition, although the term "dwarf" is used to contrast G-type main-sequence stars with giant stars or bigger, stars similar to the Sun still outshine 90% of the stars in the Milky Way (which are largely much dimmer orange dwarfs, red dwarfs, and white dwarfs which are much more common, the latter being stellar remnants).

A G-type main-sequence star will fuse hydrogen for approximately 10 billion years, until the hydrogen element is exhausted at the center of the star. When this happens, the star rapidly expands, cooling and darkening as it passes through the subgiant branch and ultimately expanding into many times its previous size at the tip of the red giant phase, about 1 billion years after leaving the main sequence. After this, the star's degenerate helium core abruptly ignites in a helium flash fusing helium, and the star passes on to the horizontal branch, and then to the asymptotic giant branch. Expanding even further as helium starts running out as it pulses violently, the star's gravity is not sufficient to hold its outer envelope, resulting in significant mass loss and shedding. The ejected material remains as a planetary nebula, radiating as it absorbs energetic photons from the photosphere. Eventually, the core begins to fade as nuclear reactions cease, and becomes a dense, compact white dwarf, which cools slowly from its high initial temperature as the nebula fades.

Spectral standard stars

The revised Yerkes Atlas system (Johnson & Morgan 1953) listed 11 G-type dwarf spectral standard stars; however, not all of these still exactly conform to this designation.

The "anchor points" of the MK spectral classification system among the G-type main-sequence dwarf stars, i.e. those standard stars that have remained unchanged over years, are beta CVn (G0V), the Sun (G2V), Kappa1 Ceti (G5V), 61 Ursae Majoris (G8V). Other primary MK standard stars include HD 115043 (G1V) and 16 Cygni B (G3V). The choices of G4 and G6 dwarf standards have changed slightly over the years among expert classifiers, but often-used examples include 70 Virginis (G4V) and 82 Eridani (G6V). There are not yet any generally agreed upon G7V and G9V standards.

Planets
Besides the Sun and its planets, some of the nearest G-type stars known to have planets include 61 Virginis, HD 102365, HD 147513, 47 Ursae Majoris, Mu Arae, and Tau Ceti.

See also 
 Hertzsprung–Russell diagram
 Habitability of G-type main-sequence stars
 G-dwarf problem
 Yellow hypergiant
 Solar twin 
 Star count, survey of stars

References

External links

 
Star types